Khesht District is a district (bakhsh) in Kazerun County, Fars Province, Iran. At the 2006 census, its population was 19,009, in 4,173 families.  It was formed from the split of Khesht and Kamaraj District.  The District has one city: Khesht. The District has one rural district (dehestan): Khesht Rural District.

References 

Kazerun County
Districts of Fars Province